Second-seeded Magnus Norman defeated Michael Chang 3–6, 6–3, 7–5 in the final to win the singles competition at the 2000 Heineken Open men's tennis tournament. Tommy Haas was the defending champion. but lost in the second round to Juan Balcells

Seeds
A champion seed is indicated in bold text while text in italics indicates the round in which that seed was eliminated.

  Tommy Haas (second round)
  Magnus Norman (champion)
  Jiří Novák (second round)
  Nicolas Escudé (first round)
  Thomas Johansson (second round)
  Sjeng Schalken (quarterfinals)
  Juan Carlos Ferrero (quarterfinals)
  Marc Rosset (quarterfinals)

Draw

References

External links
 ATP tournament profile
 ITF tournament edition details

Heineken Open
2000 Heineken Open